The foreign relations of Mexico are directed by the President of the United Mexican States and managed through the Secretariat of Foreign Affairs. The principles of the foreign policy are constitutionally recognized in the Article 89, Section 10, which include: respect for international law and legal equality of states, their sovereignty and independence, non-intervention in the domestic affairs of other countries, peaceful resolution of conflicts, and promotion of collective security through active participation in international organizations. Since the 1930s, the Estrada Doctrine has served as a crucial complement to these principles.

After the War of Independence, the relations of Mexico were focused primarily on the United States, its northern neighbor, largest trading partner, and the most powerful actor in hemispheric and world affairs. Once the order was reestablished, its foreign policy was built under hemispheric prestige in subsequent decades. Demonstrating independence from the U.S., Mexico supported the Cuban government since its establishment in the early 1960s, the Sandinista revolution in Nicaragua during the late 1970s, and leftist revolutionary groups in El Salvador during the 1980s. In the 2000s, former President Vicente Fox adopted a new foreign policy that calls for an openness and an acceptance of criticism from the international community and the increase of Mexican involvement in foreign affairs, as well as a further integration towards its northern neighbors. A greater priority to Latin America and the Caribbean was given during the administration of President Felipe Calderón.

Mexico is one of the founding members of several international organizations, most notably the United Nations, the Organization of American States, the Organization of Ibero-American States, the OPANAL and the Rio Group. For a long time, Mexico has been one of the largest contributors to the United Nations regular budget, in 2008 over 40 million dollars were given to the organization. In addition, it was the only Latin American member of the Organisation for Economic Co-operation and Development since it joined in 1994 until the accession of Chile in 2010. Mexico is considered as a newly industrialized country, a regional power and an emerging market, hence its presence in major economic groups such as the G8+5 and the G-20 major economies.

Foreign policy

The Article 89, Section 10 of the Political Constitution of the United Mexican States states the principles of the Mexican foreign policy, which were officially incorporated in 1988. The direction that the foreign policy will take lies on the President, as the head of state, and it is executed through the Secretary of Foreign Affairs. Textually, the article establishes that:

Aside from these principles constitutionally recognized, the foreign policy has been based on some doctrines. The Estrada Doctrine as the most influential and representative instrument in this field, proclaimed in the early 1930s and strictly applied until 2000, claimed that foreign governments should not judge, positively or negatively, the governments or changes in government of other nations, since such action would be a breach of their sovereignty. This policy was said to be based on the principles of non-intervention, peaceful resolution of disputes and self-determination of all nations.

During the first presidency of the National Action Party, Vicente Fox appointed Jorge Castañeda to be his Secretary of Foreign Affairs. Castañeda immediately broke with the Estrada Doctrine, promoting what was called by critics the "Castañeda Doctrine". The new foreign policy called for an openness and an acceptance of criticism from the international community, and the increase of Mexican involvement in foreign affairs.

On November 28, 2006, former President Felipe Calderón announced that Patricia Espinosa would serve as his Secretary of Foreign Affairs starting on December 1, 2006. He declared priorities include the diversification of the Mexico–United States agenda, heavily concentrated on immigration and security issues, and the rebuilding of diplomatic relations with Cuba and Venezuela, which were heavily strained during the Fox administration, as well as giving greater priority to Latin America and the Caribbean states.

Diplomatic relations

The Mexican foreign service officially started in 1822, the year after the signing of the Treaty of Córdoba, which marked the beginning of the country's independence. In 1831, legislation was passed that underpinned the establishment of diplomatic representations with other states in Europe and the Americas.

As a regional power and emerging market, Mexico holds a significant global presence. As of 2009, the Secretary of Foreign Affairs has over 150 representations at its disposal overseas, which include:
 80 embassies.
 68 consulates.
 8 permanent missions.

In the early 1970s, Mexico recognized the People's Republic of China as the sole and legitimate government of China, therefore issues related to the Republic of China (Taiwan) are managed through the Office of Consular Liaison under the circumscription of the Consulate General of Mexico in the special administrative regions of Hong Kong and Macau. In addition, Mexico does not recognize Kosovo as an independent country.

Historically, Mexico has remained neutral in international conflicts. However, in recent years some political parties have proposed an amendment of the Constitution in order to allow the Mexican army, air force or navy to collaborate with the United Nations in peacekeeping missions, or to provide military help to countries that officially ask for it.

Bilateral relations

Africa

Americas

Since the North American Free Trade Agreement (NAFTA) went into effect on January 1, 1994, relations between Canada, Mexico and the United States have significantly strengthened politically, economically, socially and culturally. During the Fox administration, a further integration towards Mexico's northern neighbors was a top priority. The September 11 attacks changed the priorities of U.S. foreign policy toward the strengthening of regional security. As a result, several trilateral summit meetings regarding this issue have occurred within the framework of the Security and Prosperity Partnership of North America (SPP), a region-level dialogue with the stated purpose of providing greater cooperation on security and economic issues, founded in Waco, Texas on March 23, 2005, by Paul Martin, former Prime Minister of Canada, Vicente Fox, then-President of Mexico, and George W. Bush, former President of the United States.

Other issues of concern are the ones related to conservation and protection of the environment, the North American Agreement on Environmental Cooperation (NAAEC) consists of a declaration of principles and objectives concerning this issues as well as concrete measures to further cooperation on these matters tripartitely. In addition, the Independent Task Force on North America advocates a greater economic and social integration between Canada, Mexico and the U.S. as a region. It is a group of prominent business, political and academic leaders from the three countries organized and sponsored by the Council on Foreign Relations (U.S.), the Canadian Council of Chief Executives, and the Mexican Council on Foreign Relations.

Mexico is an observer of several regional organizations such as the Union of South American Nations (UNASUR), the Southern Common Market (Mercosur) and the Andean Community of Nations (CAN). Former President of Argentina Néstor Kirchner expressed, during a state visit in Mexico City, that Mexico should become a full member of Mercosur, other Latin American leaders such as Luiz Inácio Lula da Silva and Tabaré Vázquez share this vision and have extended the invitation, the latter emphasized Mexico's key role in integration of Latin America and the Caribbean and stated that:

Asia

Europe 
Mexico was the first Latin American country to sign a partnership agreement with the European Union (EU), in 1997, composed by 15 members at the time. The agreement entered into force in July 2000 and has considerably strengthened bilateral relations between the two partners. It governs all relations between them, including a regular high-level political dialogue, and shared values such as democracy and human rights.

Oceania

Multilateral relations

United Nations

Mexico is the tenth largest contributor to the United Nations (UN) regular budgets. Currently, it is a member of eighteen organizations arisen from the General Assembly, Economic and Social Council and other specialized organizations of the UN.

Mexico has served as a non-permanent member of the United Nations Security Council (UNSC) three times (1946, 1982–83, 2002–03). On October 17, 2008, picking up 185 votes, it was elected to serve as a non-permanent member for the fourth time, from January 1, 2009, to December 31, 2010. Since April 1, Mexico holds the rotative presidency of the UNSC.

In recent years, the need of reforming the UNSC and its working methods has been widely impulsed by Mexico, with the support of Canada, Italy, Pakistan and other nine countries. And have formed a movement informally called the Coffee Club, created in the 1990s, which highly opposes to the reform that the Group of Four (G4) suggests.

In line with the Castañeda Doctrine of new openness in Mexico's foreign policy, established in the early first decade of the 21st century, some political parties have proposed an amendment of the Constitution in order to allow the Mexican army, air force or navy to collaborate with the UN in peacekeeping missions.

Organization of American States

As a founding member of the Organization of American States (OAS), Mexico has actively participated in the intergovernmental organization. Since the creation of the OAS, Mexico always promoted to include more principals related to international cooperation and less military aspects, its position was based on the principles of non-intervention and the pacific resolution of disputes. In addition, Mexico favored the membership of Canada in 1989 and Belize and Guatemala in 1991.

In 1964, under U.S. pressure, the OAS required all member countries to break off diplomatic ties with Cuba. Mexico refused, condemned the Bay of Pigs invasion, and did not support the expulsion of Cuba from the OAS. Years later, Mexico strongly opposed to the creation of a military alliance within the OAS framework, and condemned the U.S. invasion of Panama in 1989.

Under the Fox administration, the candidacy of then-Secretary of Foreign Affairs Luis Ernesto Derbez for the Secretary General of the OAS was highly promoted. It eventually failed but brought a diplomatic crisis with Chile and harsh critics from the Mexican public opinion when Derbez had announced that he would no longer compete against José Miguel Insulza but the Mexican delegation abstained despite being previously agreed that it would vote for the Chilean candidate.

Mega-Diverse Countries

The megadiverse countries are a group of countries that harbor the majority of the Earth's species and are therefore considered extremely biodiverse and therefore are of utmost priority on the global environmental agenda. Conservation International identified 17 megadiverse countries in 1998, most are located in or have territories in the tropics.

In 2002, Mexico formed a separate organization named Like-Minded Megadiverse Countries, consisting of countries rich in biological diversity and associated traditional knowledge. This organization includes a different set of involved megadiverse countries than those identified by Conservation International.

Participation in international organizations
 Regional Organizations

 ALADI
  CAN 
 CELAC
 IDB
 LAC-EU
 LAES
 LAIA
 Latin American and Caribbean Integration and Development
 LAPR
 Ibero-American Summit
  Mercosur 
 OAS
 OEI
 OPANAL
 Rio Group
  SICA 
 Summits of the Americas
  UNASUR 
 UNECLAC

 International and Multilateral Organizations

 APEC
 CCW
 CD
 Codex Alimentarius Commission
 ECOSOC
  FAO
 G8+5
 G15
 G20
 G20+
 Group of Megadiverse Countries
 GL-MMC
 IBRD
  ICRC
  ICC
  ILO
 IMF
 IOM
 IPCC
 IPU
 IRENA
 ITC
 Interpol
 ITU
 Latin American Integration Association
 Latin Union
 NAM 
 
 UNAIDS
 UNOCHA
 UNCTAD
 UNDIR
 UNEO
 UNEP
 UNESCO
 UNHCR
 UNITAR
 UNRISD
 UNWTO
  UPU
 World Bank
  WHO
 WIPO
  WMO
 WSIS
 WTO

Free trade agreements

Mexico has negotiated upwards of 60 free trade agreements with various countries. Ordered by date, these include:

 1994: North American Free Trade Agreement with Canada and the United States. Replaced by the United States-Mexico-Canada Agreement (2018).
 1995: G3 Free Trade Agreement with Colombia and Venezuela (Venezuela withdrew in 2006; renamed to Mexico-Colombia Free Trade Agreement in 2010).
 1995: Free Trade Agreement with Bolivia (terminated in 2010).1
 1995: Free Trade Agreement with Costa Rica.
 1998: Free Trade Agreement with Nicaragua.
 1999: Free Trade Agreement with Chile.
 2000: Free Trade Agreement with the European Union.
 2000: Free Trade Agreement with Israel.
 2001: Free Trade Agreement with the Northern Triangle (Guatemala, El Salvador and Honduras).
 2001: Free Trade Agreement with the European Free Trade Association (Iceland, Liechtenstein, Norway and Switzerland).
 2004: Free Trade Agreement with Uruguay.
 2005: Agreement for the Strengthening of the Economic Partnership with Japan.
 2011: Unifying Free Trade Agreement with Central America (participating Central American nations include Costa Rica, El Salvador, Guatemala, Honduras, and Nicaragua).
 2012: Free Trade Agreement with Peru.
 2014: Pacific Alliance with three South American nations, plus an associated FTA with Singapore signed in 2022.
 2014: Free Trade Agreement with Panama.
 2018: Comprehensive and Progressive Agreement for Trans-Pacific Partnership (replaces cancelled Trans-Pacific Partnership agreement from 2016; currently nine other nations participate).
 2020: Trade Continuity Agreement with the United Kingdom.2
1:The Bolivian government denounced the Mexico-Bolivia Free Trade Agreement's provisions on investments, services, intellectual property, and government purchases as incompatible with its 2009 constitution on June 7, 2010. In order to maintain free movement of goods between Mexico and Bolivia, the governments of the two countries agreed to replace the free trade agreement with an Economic Complementation Agreement effective on the same date. 
2: The United Kingdom left the European Union on January 31, 2020. Under the terms of the Brexit withdrawal agreement, trade relations between Mexico and the UK continued to be bound by the terms of the Mexico-EU trade agreement for the duration of the UK's withdrawal transition period. On December 15, 2020, in preparation for the UK's final EU withdrawal on December 31, the UK and Mexico signed a temporary Trade Continuity Agreement in order to maintain free trade between the two countries. Negotiations between the two countries for a new free trade agreement to replace the existing continuity agreement began in July 2022.

Transnational issues

Illicit drugs

Mexico remains a transit and not a cocaine production country. Methamphetamine and cannabis production do take place in Mexico and are responsible for an estimated 80% of the methamphetamine on the streets in the United States, while 1,100 metric tons of marijuana are smuggled each year from Mexico.

In 1990 just over half the cocaine imported into the U.S. came through Mexico, by 2007 that had risen to more than 90 percent, according to U.S. State Department estimates. Although violence between drug cartels has been occurring long before the war began, the government used its police forces in the 1990s and early first decade of the 21st century with little effect. That changed on December 11, 2006, when newly elected President Felipe Calderón sent 6,500 federal troops to the state of Michoacán to put an end to drug violence there. This action is regarded as the first major retaliation made against cartel operations, and is generally viewed as the starting point of the war between the government and the drug cartels. As time progressed, Calderón continued to escalate his anti-drug campaign, in which there are now well over 25,000 troops involved. It is estimated that during 2006, there were about 2,000 drug-related violent deaths, about 2,300 deaths during 2007, and more than 6,200 people by the end of 2008. Many of the dead were gang members killed by rivals or by the government, some have been bystanders.

Drug trafficking is acknowledged as an issue with shared responsibilities that requires coordinated measures by the U.S. and Mexico. In March 2009, United States Secretary of State Hillary Clinton, when officially visited Mexico City, stated that:

Illegal migration

Almost a third of all immigrants in the U.S. were born in Mexico, being the source of the greatest number of both authorized (20%) and unauthorized (56%) migrants who come to the U.S. every year. Since the early 1990s, Mexican immigrants are no longer concentrated in California, the Southwest, and Illinois, but have been coming to new gateway states, including New York, North Carolina, Georgia, Nevada, and Washington, D.C., in increasing numbers. This phenomenon can be mainly attributed to poverty in Mexico, the growing demand for unskilled labor in the U.S., the existence of established family and community networks that allow migrants to arrive in the U.S. with people known to them.

The framework of U.S. immigration law has largely remained the same since 1965. The U.S. economy needs both high-skilled and low-skilled immigrant workers to remain competitive and to have enough workers who continue to pay into Social Security and Medicare as the U.S. population grows older. Nonetheless, there are currently very few channels for immigration to the U.S. for work-related reasons under current law. Furthermore, Amnesty International has taken concern regarding the excessive brutality inflicted upon illegal immigrants, which includes beatings, sexual assault, denial of medical attention, and denial of food, water and warmth for long periods.

For many years, the Mexican government showed limited interest in the issues. However, former President Vicente Fox actively sought to recognize the contribution of migrants to the U.S. and Mexico and to pursue a bilateral migration agreement with the U.S. government, which eventually failed. The current administration has placed an emphasis on how to create jobs in Mexico, enhance border security, and protect Mexican citizens living abroad.

Traditionally, Mexico built a reputation as one of the classic asylum countries, with a varying attitude toward refugees from Spain and other European countries before and during World War II, from Latin America's Southern Cone in the 1970s, and from Central America since the beginning of the 1980s. However, in recent years refugees who solicit asylum are usually treated as if they were just immigrants, with exhaustive administrative processes. The southern border of Mexico has experienced a significant increase in legal and illegal flows over the past decade, in particular for migrants seeking to transit Mexico to reach the U.S. José Luis Soberanes, president of the National Human Rights Commission, condemned the repressing policy implemented by the Mexican government against illegal immigrants who cross the country's southern border. President Calderón modified the "General Law on Population" to derogate some penalties against immigrants like jail time, instead imposing fines of up to US$500 on illegal immigrants.

See also
Index of Mexico-related articles

Diplomacy
 List of diplomatic missions in Mexico
 List of diplomatic missions of Mexico
 Mexican Council on Foreign Relations
 Secretariat of Foreign Affairs (Mexico)

Policy and Doctrine
 Estrada Doctrine
 Castañeda Doctrine
 Human rights in Mexico

Footnotes

References
 Pereña-García, Mercedes (2001). Las Relaciones Diplomáticas de México. Plaza y Valdés, p. 94. .
 Velázquez Flores, Rafael (2007). Factores, Bases y Fundamentos de la Política Exterior de México. Plaza y Valdés, p. 331. .
 Alponte, Juan María (1993). La Política Exterior de México en el Nuevo Orden Mundial : Antología de Principios y Tesis. FCE, p. 428. .
 Ministry of Foreign Affairs (2005) La Política Exterior Mexicana en la Transición. FCE, SRE, p. 281. .
 Lajous Vargas, Roberta (2000) Los Retos de la Política Exterior de México en el Siglo XXI. SRE, p. 560. .
 El Colegio de México (2007). Historia General de México: Versión 2000. El Colegio de México, Centro de Estudios Históricos, p. 1103. .
 Selee, Andrew D. (2007). More Than Neighbors: An Overview of Mexico and U.S.-Mexican Relations. Woodrow Wilson International Center for Scholars, p. 43. .

External links
 Secretaría de Relaciones Exteriores — Official website of the Secretariat of Foreign Affairs 
 Secretariat of Foreign Affairs — Official website of the Secretariat of Foreign Affairs
 Treaties Signed by Mexico — Searchable Database 
 Mexican Missions to the United Nations — Official website